Governor Thomas H. Kean is a ferry operated by New York Waterways. 
On January 15, 2009, the ferry, under the command of Brittany Catanzaro, helped rescue the passengers of US Airways flight 1549, after the failure of both engines forced the aircraft to make an emergency landing on the Hudson River.

On November 3, 2017, the ferry rescued a man who had jumped into the Hudson.  The jumper had stolen a cab just a few blocks away from his jump.  After his rescue crew members secured the man, and turned him over to police, who, in turn, transferred him to the Bellevue Hospital for a mental health assessment.

On May 15, 2019, Governor Thomas H. Kean rescued the pilot of a helicopter that ditched into the river.

Passengers enter and exit from her bow. Currents in the Hudson River can be strong.

References 

Ferries of New York City